Thamnopalpa is a monotypic genus of moth in the family Lecithoceridae. It contains the species Thamnopalpa argomitra, which is found in Indonesia (Sumatra).

References

Natural History Museum Lepidoptera genus database

Lecithoceridae
Monotypic moth genera
Moths of Indonesia